The 1981 Cork Junior Hurling Championship was the 84th staging of the Cork Junior Hurling Championship since its establishment by the Cork County Board. The championship ran from 27 September to 1 November 1981.

On 1 November 1981, Milford won the championship following a 1–10 to 0–11 defeat of St. Catherine's in the final. It remains their only championship title.

Christy Clancy was the championship's top scorer with 0-13.

Qualification

Results

Quarter-finals

 Milford received a bye in this round.

Semi-finals

Final

Championship statistics

Top scorers

Overall

In a single game

Miscellaneous

 Bernie O'Connor had the unusual distinction of playing for Meelin while also serving as coach of Milford.

References

Cork Junior Hurling Championship
Cork Junior Hurling Championship